The Canadian Open is an darts tournament that has been held annually since 1977.

List of tournaments

Men's

Tournament records
 Most wins 5:   John Lowe.
 Most Finals 6:   John Lowe.
 Most Semi Finals 5:   Bob Anderson .
 Most Quarter Finals 5:  Bob Anderson.
 Most Appearances 7:  Ken MacNeil,   Greg Lewis,  Dion Laviolette,  Dave Cameron.
 Most Prize Money won C$4,427:  Phil Taylor.
 Best winning average (.) : , .
 Youngest Winner age 20:  Shaun Narain.
 Oldest Winner age 45:  Carl Mercer.

See also
List of BDO ranked tournaments
List of WDF tournaments

References

External links
 National Darts Federation of Canada

Darts tournaments
Sports competitions in Canada
Recurring sporting events established in 1977
1977 establishments in Canada
Darts in Canada